Little Drops of Happy is a 2017 Nigerian therapeutical movie facilitated  by Pinnacle Medicals Speakout initiative in conjunction with Derwin productions with support from the American Embassy. The movie creates awareness about mental health, depression, suicide and how they can be tackled. The movie that was produced and directed by produced and directed by Dr. Maymunah Kadiri and Grace Edwin-Okon stars Ngozi Nwosu, Mercy Aigbe, Osas Ighodaro, Ayoola Ayoola and others.

Synopsis 
The movie revolves around a woman who had to deal with domestic violence and unfaithfulness of her husband. She was mentally depressed to the Sathe of being called a mad woman. Eventually, she was able to save herself and her promiscuous husband.

Premiere 
The movie first premiered at Genesis Deluxe Cinema, Lekki, Lagos on November 18, 2017. It was also premiered at Silverbird Galleria, Victoria Island, Lagos State and nationwide.

Cast 
Ayoola Ayoola,  Ngozi Nwosu, Seun Kentebe, Ijeoma Onyeato,  Lisa Omorodion, Mercy Aigbe, Osas Ighodaro Ajibade, Ayobami Ajayi, Enem Inwang .

References 

2017 films
Nigerian drama films